The original Regensburg Synagogue, erected between 1210 and 1227, was an edifice in Old Romanesque style in Regensburg (also known as Ratisbon), southern Germany, on the site of the former Jewish hospital, in the center of the ghetto, where the present Neue Pfarre stands. Two etchings made by Albrecht Altdorfer of the synagogue shortly before it was destroyed on February 22, 1519, provide the first portrait of an actual architectural monument in European printmaking. In 1519 following the death of Emperor Maximilian, who had long been a protector of the Jews in the imperial cities, extracting from them substantial taxes in exchange, the city of Regensburg, which blamed its economic troubles on its prosperous Jewish community, expelled the 500 Jews. The Jews themselves had demolished the interior of their venerable synagogue, on the site of which a chapel was built in honor of the Virgin. According to a chronicle the exiles settled, under the protection of the Duke of Bavaria, on the opposite bank of the Danube, in Stadt-am-Hof, and in villages in the vicinity; from these they were expelled in the course of the same century.

In 1669 Jews were again permitted to reside in Regensburg but it was not until April 2, 1841, that the community was able to dedicate its new synagogue. In 1907 however, it was demolished for fear of collapse. Rebuilt in 1912 at a different place, when the town had a Jewish population of about 600, it was destroyed by the Nazis on November 9, 1938, during Kristallnacht.

Gallery

References

Sources

The Jewish Encyclopedia: Ratisbon

Jewish German history
13th-century synagogues
Synagogues completed in 1916
1938 disestablishments in Germany
Buildings and structures in Regensburg
Synagogues destroyed during Kristallnacht (Germany)
Medieval synagogues
Religious buildings and structures in Bavaria
Regensburg